Gavin Bayreuther (born May 12, 1994) is an American professional ice hockey defenseman currently playing for the  Columbus Blue Jackets of the National Hockey League (NHL).

Playing career
Bayreuther grew up in Canaan, New Hampshire, attended a preparatory middle-school Cardigan Mountain School.  Bayreuther then attended Holderness School, located in Plymouth, NH. He played four seasons at St. Lawrence University, where he was named to the NCAA East Second All-American Team and ECAC First All-Team during his junior and senior seasons.

After his senior season, Bayreuther signed with the Dallas Stars as an undrafted free agent on March 15, 2017, and was assigned to the Texas Stars after training camp. On November 15, 2018, he was called up to Dallas after Marc Methot was placed on injured reserve. He recorded his first career NHL goal on November 23, in a 6–4 win over the Ottawa Senators.

On October 10, 2020, Bayreuther was signed as a free agent to a one-year, two-way contract with the Columbus Blue Jackets. In the pandemic delayed  season, Bayreuther split time between the Blue Jackets and AHL affiliate, the Cleveland Monsters. In 9 games with the Blue Jackets, Bayreuther collected one goal from the blueline.

On July 21, 2021, Bayreuther was selected from the Blue Jackets at the 2021 NHL Expansion Draft by the Seattle Kraken. In a surprise selection as an impending free agent, Bayreuther's tenure with the Kraken was short lived, as he returned to the Blue Jackets in signing a two-year contract on July 28, 2021.

Personal life
Bayreuther has three siblings, two brothers and a sister named Morgan. He is the cousin of fellow defenseman Ben Lovejoy.

Career statistics

Awards and honors

References

External links
 

1994 births
Living people
American men's ice hockey defensemen
Cedar Rapids RoughRiders players
Cleveland Monsters players
Columbus Blue Jackets players
Dallas Stars players
Fargo Force players
Ice hockey people from New Hampshire
People from Canaan, New Hampshire
St. Lawrence Saints men's ice hockey players
Texas Stars players
Undrafted National Hockey League players
AHCA Division I men's ice hockey All-Americans